Colonial Street is one of the backlot street sets at the Universal Studios Lot in Universal City, California. The street set has a long history, spanning over 60 years of movies and television. From 2004 to 2012, it was used in the filming of the TV series Desperate Housewives, in which the street was known as Wisteria Lane. After the production of Desperate Housewives ended, the street underwent a small makeover to remove the essence of Wisteria Lane, so that it could be used in other productions. , most of the iconic white fencing and wisteria has been removed. Colonial Street has since been used for the NBC comedy About a Boy and the NBC series Telenovela, featuring Desperate Housewives star Eva Longoria.

History

In 1988, Colonial Street was overhauled for Tom Hanks comedy The 'Burbs. The old Leave It to Beaver home was removed. Following the movie, the homes were rearranged again so Circle Drive was connected once again.

Among the most noticeable changes were the removals of a church facade, seen on Murder She Wrote, in order to make room for Edie's house, and of the so-called Colonial Mansion, which was replaced by a park.

Wisteria Lane 

Wisteria Lane is a fictional street, appearing in the American television series Desperate Housewives.

Buildings

Productions
Several TV series and motion pictures have been filmed on Colonial Street, including:

About a Boy (2014–2015)
Adam-12Angie TribecaBaby Daddy (Season 03, Episode 21)Bedtime for BonzoBeethovenBest Little Whorehouse in TexasBuffy the Vampire SlayerThe 'BurbsCasper 1997 prequelDeep ImpactDelta HouseThe Desperate HoursDesperate Housewives (2004-2012)Father's DayThe Ghost and Mr. ChickenGet a Life (1990-1992)Ghost WhispererGremlinsThe Hardy Boys/Nancy Drew MysteriesHarveyHouse of 1000 CorpsesKicking and ScreamingThe Ladykillers (the 2004 remake)Leave It to Beaver (the original series)Leave It to Beaver (the 1997 remake)Lucas TannerMalcolm in the Middle (Season 3, episode 3)Marcus Welby, M.D.MatlockThe Mick (S2E4)Mockingbird Lane (2012)The MunstersMurder She WroteNever Have I Ever
The New Lassie
Parenthood (2010 TV series) (S04e07)
Providence
Psycho (the 1998 remake)
Sabrina, the Teenage Witch
Send Me No Flowers
The Shaggy Dog (1959 movie and 1994 TV movie remake)
Sliders
So Goes My Love
Superstore (TV series)
Telenovela (2015-2016)The Thrill of It AllThe Visitor (1997 TV movie)Written on the WindWhy Him?''

In addition, some music videos have used the street to shoot scenes:

Melanie B. - "For Once in My Life"
Smash Mouth - "All Star"
The Offspring - "Why Don't You Get a Job?"
Nelly featuring Kelly Rowland - "Dilemma"
Diddy featuring Black Rob & Mark Curry - "Bad Boy for Life"
Boxcar Racer - "There Is"
Michael Bublé - "It's a Beautiful Day"
Bring Me the Horizon - "Follow You"

See also
Wisteria Lane
RKO Forty Acres
Courthouse Square

Notes

References

Bibliography

External links

Maps
 1988 map of Colonial Street (during the filming of the 'Burbs)
 1989-1996 map of Colonial Street (hi-res version but church facade cut off)
 Overview photo of Colonial Street in 2004, before Colonial Mansion, the Church facade, and School and Stores facades were removed for Season Two of Desperate Housewives

Homes
 Building #1 - Delta House
 Building #2 - Allison Home
 Building #3 - Munsters House (originally known as the Maxim house)
 Building #4 - Johnson Home
 Building #5 - Dana Home
 Colonial Mansion
 Church (Facade was removed in 2005 to build Desperate Housewive character Edie Britt's house)
 Building #11 - Drew House
 Building #12 - Corner House
 Building #13 - Seven Gables
 Building #14 - Chicken Ranch Building

Movies
 1950 to 1955
 1955 to 1980
 1981 to 1988
 1988 to 2004
 2008 to 2009

General
Colonial Street on Retroweb

Backlot sets
Universal Parks & Resorts attractions by name
Culture of Hollywood, Los Angeles